EuroShogi is a shogi variant invented by Vladimír Pribylinec starting in 2000. The game developed from an early version of chess variant Echos in 1977, leading to Cubic Chess, then later to Cubic Shogi, and finally to EuroShogi. Instead of the classic figures, 18 black and 18 white cubes are used, which are on two opposing sides without symbols. The other two cubes on the opposite sides have one white and one black symbol. The other opposing sides are the same symbols of the opposite color - their promotion is indicated by a circle around symbol. Symbol on top of its mobility. The pieces are placed on the board so that they are oriented towards players without any symbolic surfaces. Plays on a board with 8x8 fields of the same color. 

A major tenet of EuroShogi is simplification without radical changes, while maintaining good gameplay. The variant Heian shogi with playing board 8×8 or 9×8 is the only shogi variant somewhat similar to EuroShogi; other variants are larger or smaller, have new units, or lack drops.

Game rules
On the board the furthest three  from each player is their promotion zone. The starting setup is as shown. Pieces capture the same as they move.

Composition of pieces per player: 1 king, 1 tower, 2 bishops, 2 generals, 2 knights, 8 pawns.

Movement

King
The king steps one square in any direction, orthogonal or diagonal. The king does not promote.

Rook
The rook moves any number of unoccupied squares along any of the four orthogonal directions. Promoted rook is marked by the circle
it moves as king too.

Bishop
The bishop moves any number of unoccupied squares along any of the four diagonal directions. Promoted bishop is marked by the circle, it moves as king too.

General
The general steps one square in one of the four orthogonal directions, or one square diagonally forward. (Six possibilities.) The general does not promote.

Knight
The knight jumps at an angle intermediate to orthogonal and diagonal, equivalent to: one square frontal forward, then one square diagonally forward, in a single move. The knight leaps over any intervening men. The EuroShogi knight has an additional extension: it can also move one square horizontally to the side. Promoted knight is marked by the circle, it moves as general.

Before promotion:

After promotion:

Pawn
The pawn steps one square forward. Promoted pawn is marked by the circle, it moves as general.

Starting position
White: KD1 GC1 GE1 RG2 Bb2 BF1 NB1 NG1, pawns in the whole 3rd row 
Black: KE8 GD8 Gf8 Rb7 BC8 BG7 NB8 NG8, pawns in the whole 6th row

Promotion
A player's promotion zone consists of the three farthest . If a player's man crosses into its promotion zone, the player immediately promotes the man at the end of the turn. The king and general cannot promote. A pawn and the knight, after entering into the promotion zone instantly obtain a general movement by rotating its cube. After being dropped from the stack into the promotion zone they do not get promoted instantly, but they can be promoted when they move. A rook becomes a promoted rook, the bishop becomes a promoted bishop. A rook and a bishop dropped from the reservoir into the promotion zone are not promoted instantly, but they can be when they move (out of, or wholly within the zone).

Drops
Each player owns a stack for staging captured men, which are always stored not to promote. This is achieved by rotating a cube: captured unit changes a colour and loses a promotion.
A player whose turn it is to move may either move a man on the chessboard, or drop any man from his stack on any vacant square, but a pawn may not be dropped on a file already containing a pawn of the same color. or on the last rank (there it can not move).

Check and checkmate
Check, checkmate, and draws follow the same conditions as in classical chess. However, it is not permitted to give perpetual check in EuroShogi. 
 Repetition: If the same position occurs three times with the same player to move, then the game is a draw. (Recall, however, the prohibition against giving perpetual check.)
 Impasse: The game might reach an impasse if kings are advanced into their respective promotion zones and neither player has any hope of mating the other; or, if there is no chance of gaining any further material.

See also
 Crazyhouse

References

Bibliography

External links
Official website (webarchive)
chessvideos.tv setup graphic
A concise explanation of shogi using chess figures and diagrams

Board games introduced in 2000
Abstract strategy games
Shogi variants